John Conroy (17 April 1904 – 13 February 1969) was an Irish trade union leader.

Born in Wicklow, he was the son of Thomas Conroy, a railway signalman, and Catherine Conroy (née McNamara). He started work early and held a variety of jobs until, in 1923, he was employed by the Irish Transport and General Workers' Union (ITGWU) as their full-time organiser in Wicklow. Although he and a colleague were charged with conspiracy,  they were found not guilty, and Conroy continued his union career. After a period working in Limerick, he moved to Dublin to take charge of the union's Industrial Section. He served as ITGWU vice-president from 1946 to 1953 and general president from 1953 to 1959 and 1968 to 1969.

As President of the union, Conroy focused on a programme of modernisation, along with campaigning for a national minimum wage. He also worked with James Larkin Jnr, to promote the merger of the Irish Trades Union Congress and the Congress of Irish Unions, which was accomplished with the founding of the Irish Congress of Trade Unions in 1959. 

This accomplished, Conroy served as the first president of the new organisation, and discussed a merger of the ITGWU with Larkin's Workers' Union of Ireland, although this did not occur until many years later.

Family
Conroy had two daughters by his first marriage. His second wife, whom he married in 1959, was Sheila Williams, a hotel and restaurant worker. A prominent ITGWU activist, she was the first woman to sit on the union's national executive (1955–59). They had no children.

Death
Conroy died 13 February 1969, aged 64, in the Adelaide Hospital, Dublin, after an illness, and was buried in Deans Grange Cemetery.

References

1904 births
1969 deaths
People from County Wicklow
Presidents of the Irish Congress of Trade Unions